Jaap Sahib (or Japu Sahib) is the morning prayer of the Sikhs. The beaded prayers were composed by the Tenth Sikh Guru, Guru Gobind Singh and is found at the start of the Sikh scripture Dasam Granth. 
This Bani is an important Sikh prayer, and is recited by the Panj Pyare while preparing Amrit on the occasion of Amrit Sanchar (initiation), a ceremony held to Amrit initiates into the Khalsa and it is a part of a Sikh's Nitnem (daily meditation). The Jaap Sahib is reminiscent of Japji Sahib composed by Guru Nanak, and both praise God.

Meaning of jaap 
Following are some accepted meanings of jaap:
 The popular meanings of Jaap is to recite, to repeat, or to chant.
 Jaap also means to understand. Gurbani cites Aisa Giaan Japo Man Mere, Hovo Chakar Sache Kere, where Jap word means to understand wisdom.

Jaap is a Sanskrit word meaning "to utter in a low voice, whisper, mutter (especially prayers or incantations); to invoke or call upon in a low voice".
Jaap Sahib is a rhythmic hymn composed like a necklace of pearls and gems, beauteously (beautifully) arranged around a string: the string is the Supreme God; the pearls and gems are His attributes, excellences, and glories. It basically helps reader do a daily Greetings to Waheguru in 199 verses, just like we do hello to each other. The glories sung by Guru Sahib revolve around the following attributes of God:

God is metaphysical, beyond time, Eternal, Unborn, Uncreated, Self-existent, and without form, feature, colour or contour. Therefore, neither can God be described or depicted, nor can anyone make an  image or idols of that which is undefinable.
God's  manifestations are universally pervasive. God cannot be confined to any particular place, land, country, religion, race, garb, body or name.
God is the Creator of the Universe and the laws governing it. Never can anyone be outside the ambit of these laws nor can anyone have the power to oppose them. God's Law and Justice is Righteous and Ultimate.
God's  is pervasive  in all that 'He' has created, yet God also extends beyond 'His' creations; God is thus Immanent in His Creation and at the same time Transcends it.
God is Omnipotent, Omnipresent, and Omniscient; nothing, whether good or evil, can happen outside of the Creator's Will; God is the Creator-Sustainer-Annuller of His Creation. God is the Life of life, the Death of death,  the Darkness of darkness, the Light of light.

Content

The Jaap Sahib is a recitation and praise of God. It includes various names of God in various languages. Understand the fact that god has no name but is called by various names by devotees based on their experience and the blessings they have obtained from him. There is only one sole religion of humans - humanity, and the worldly path that we choose to understand the natural power, our source, source of creation -  is called faith only.

All faiths are rivers and are destined to merge into one great "Ocean - the lord, the light"; whatever you may call, think, believe or perceive.

Form
Jaap Sahib is made up of 199 verses and is the first Bani of the Dasam Granth (p. 1-10).

The Jaap Sahib begins with the words:

This line is clearly intended to authenticate Guru Gobind Singh Ji as the Author of the Dasam Granth.

Jaap is a Sanskrit word which means "to utter in a low voice, whisper, mutter (especially prayers or incantations); to invoke or call upon in a low voice." The form of the word here is Japu, which makes it a noun, meaning "meditation on nothing but the Truth; ('God') (or The True God).

Language
The language of Jaap, is close to classical with words and compounds drawn from Sanskrit, Brij Bhasha, Arabic and Urdu. The contents of Jaap Sahib, are divided into various Chhands bearing the name of the related meter according to the then prevalent system of prosody in India.

Japji Sahib and Jaap Sahib
The Guru Granth Sahib starts with Japji Sahib, while Dasam Granth starts with Jaap Sahib also called Japu Sahib. Guru Nanak is credited with the former, while Guru Gobind Singh is credited with the latter. The Jaap Sahib, unlike Japji Sahib, is composed in Braj bhasha, Sanskrit and Arabic, and with 199 stanzas, is longer than Japji Sahib. The Jaap Sahib is, like Japji Sahib, a praise of God as the unchanging, loving, unborn, ultimate power.

References

Bibliography 

 
 
 Neki, Jaswant (2008). Basking in the Divine Presence - A Study of Jap Sahib. Amritsar: Singh Brothers.
 Singh, Sahib (2003). Jaap Sahib Steek. Amritsar: Singh Brothers.

External links 
Read Jaap Sahib Bani in Punjabi
Read Jaap Sahib Bani in Hindi
Download Punjabi Steek from Damdami Taksal

Sikh terminology
Sikh scripture
Sikh prayer
Dasam Granth
Prayer beads